Joseph Michel (1679–1736) was a French baroque chorister, composer and music teacher.

Joseph Michel may also refer to:

 Joseph Michel (politician) (1925–2016), Belgian politician who was President of the Chamber of Representatives and was twice Minister of the Interior
 Joseph Eugène Michel (1821–1885), French lawyer, Representative and then Senator of Basses-Alpes
 Joseph Edward Michel, Ghana Army officer